Köln was a light cruiser, the third member of the  that was operated between 1929 and March 1945, including service in World War II. She was operated by two German navies, the Reichsmarine and the Kriegsmarine. Köln was built by the Reichsmarinewerft Wilhelmshaven; she was laid down in August 1926, launched in May 1928, and commissioned into the Reichsmarine on 15 January 1930.

Like her sister ships, Köln served as a training ship for naval cadets in the 1930s, and joined the non-intervention patrols during the Spanish Civil War during the latter part of the decade. After the outbreak of World War II in September 1939, she conducted several operations in the North Sea, but did not encounter any British warships. She participated in the attack on Bergen during Operation Weserübung in April 1940, and she was the only member of her class to survive the operation. In 1942, she was modified to carry a Flettner Fl 282 helicopter experimentally. Later in 1942, she returned to Norway, but did not see significant action. She remained there until early 1945, when she returned to Germany; in March, she was sunk by American bombers in Wilhelmshaven. She remained on an even keel, with her gun turrets above water; this allowed her to provide gunfire support to defenders of the city until the end of the war in May 1945.

Design

She displaced  at full load. The ship had a forecastle deck that extended for most of the length of the ship, ending just aft of the superfiring rear turret. Her superstructure consisted of a conning tower forward with a heavy, tubular mast and a secondary conning tower further aft. Köln had a crew of 21 officers and 493 enlisted men.

Her propulsion system consisted of four steam turbines and a pair of 10-cylinder four-stroke diesel engines. Steam for the turbines was provided by six Marine-type, double-ended, oil-fired water-tube boilers, which were vented through a pair of funnels.

The ship was armed with a main battery of nine  SK C/25 guns mounted in three triple gun turrets. One was located forward, and two were placed in a superfiring pair aft. The rear gun turrets were offset to increase their arc of fire. They were supplied with 1,080 rounds of ammunition, for 120 shells per gun. The ship was also equipped with two  SK L/45 anti-aircraft guns in single mounts; they had 400 rounds of ammunition each. Köln also carried four triple torpedo tube mounts located amidships; they were supplied with twenty-four  torpedoes. She was also capable of carrying 120 naval mines.

Service history

Köln was ordered as "Cruiser D" under the contract name Ersatz Arcona, as a replacement for the old cruiser . The keel for Köln was laid on 7 August 1926 at the Reichsmarinewerft shipyard in Wilhelmshaven. She was launched on 23 May 1928, and commissioned into the Reichsmarine on 15 January 1930, the last member of her class to be completed. She spent the year conducting sea trials and training in the Baltic Sea. In 1931, she was modified with dual 8.8 cm anti-aircraft guns to replace the original single mounts, the rear superstructure was enlarged, and a fire control system was installed aft. Köln departed on a cruise into the Atlantic in early 1932 for more extensive sea trials. After returning to Germany, she took on her first crew of naval cadets for a world cruise, departing Germany in late 1932. The tour lasted a full year; she stopped in ports across the globe, including in the Atlantic, Pacific, and Indian Oceans, and the Mediterranean Sea. In Australia the tour stops included Adelaide, Melbourne, Sydney and Hobart, with the crew taking place in several publicised football games against local teams that included a Royal Australian Navy team in Sydney.

In 1935, the ship had an aircraft catapult installed, along with cranes to handle float planes. A pole mast was also installed on the rear side of the aft funnel. Köln continued to serve as a training ship until early 1936, when she was transferred to fishery protection duty. Later that year, she joined the non-intervention patrols off Spain during the Spanish Civil War. After the German heavy cruiser  was attacked by Republican bombers in the so-called "Deutschland incident", Köln transported wounded crew members from Deutschland back to Germany. Köln conducted a further four patrols off Spain before returning to fishery protection in the North Sea in 1938. Late in the year, she went into drydock for a refit in Kiel.

In March 1939, Köln sailed to Memel (now Klaipėda, Lithuania), in connection with the annexation of the Memelland district, which Germany had demanded be returned by Lithuania.

World War II
In the final days of August 1939, Köln was stationed in the western Baltic to prevent Polish vessels from fleeing after the planned German invasion of Poland on 1 September; she was unsuccessful in this task. She thereafter joined her sister ships in laying a series of defensive minefields. Köln joined Gneisenau and nine destroyers for a sortie into the North Sea on 7–9 October. The goal was to draw units of the Royal Navy over a U-boat line and into range of the Luftwaffe, though it failed on both counts. The British launched an air attack consisting of 12 Wellington bombers, though it too failed to hit any of the German warships. On the 22nd, Köln and Leipzig were detached to join an unsuccessful patrol for Allied merchant ships in the Skagerrak along with Deutschland and three torpedo boats. The patrol lasted until 25 November, and failed to locate any Allied freighters. On 13 December, Köln, Leipzig, and  covered the return of several destroyers that had laid an offensive minefield off Newcastle.

Köln took part in Operation Weserübung, the invasion of Norway, in April 1940. She was assigned Group 3, tasked with the assault on Bergen, along with her sister Königsberg. She reached the harbor unscathed, but Königsberg was not so lucky; she was badly damaged by Norwegian coastal guns. Köln nevertheless supported the German infantry ashore with her main guns. After the port was secured, she returned to Germany, along with a pair of destroyers. In late 1940, she went into drydock for further modifications. A degaussing coil was installed, along with a helicopter landing platform on top of turret "Bruno". She thereafter served as a testbed for the Flettner Fl 282 helicopter, a task she performed until 1942.

While still conducting experiments with the FI 282 in September 1941, Köln provided gunfire support to ground troops attacking Soviet positions on Dagö in the Gulf of Riga. She also bombarded Soviet positions on Ristna. She joined the battleship , Admiral Scheer, Nürnberg, and several destroyers and torpedo boats formed the Baltic Fleet, which was intended to block any Soviet warships from fleeing the eastern Baltic. No Soviet vessels attempted to do so, however. On 13 July, the Soviet submarine  tried to attack Köln, but the cruiser's escorts forced the Soviet submarine to break off the attack.

Toward the end of 1941, she was transferred to the North Sea, and went into drydock for her last major modification. This consisted of the installation of a FuMO 21 radar set on the forward command center roof. In July 1942, Köln departed Germany to join the growing naval presence in Norway, though she saw no major action there. While en route from Narvik to Altenfjord, the flotilla was attacked by the British submarine , but the torpedoes passed behind the German ships. The convoy was instead attacked by U-boats and long-range bombers, which sank thirteen freighters. She returned to Germany in January 1943, where she was decommissioned in Kiel on 17 February. She was sent to drydock in early 1944 for an overhaul to prepare her to return to combat duty; this was completed by 1 July. The cruiser served briefly as a training ship before escorting German merchant vessels in Norway. While en route from Kristiansand on 7 July, the ship laid a defensive minefield in the Skagerrak. She and three destroyers laid another minefield on 14–15 July, before steaming to Trondheim.

On the night of 13–14 December, Köln was attacked by British bombers in Oslofjord; several near misses caused damage to her propulsion system that required repair in Germany. She departed Norway on 23 January 1945 in company with Admiral Hipper and a destroyer, and arrived in Kiel on 8 February. She then proceeded to Wilhelmshaven, where she was again attacked by Allied bombers repeatedly. On 30 March, B-24 Liberators from the Eighth Air Force attacked the harbor; Köln was hit and sank on an even keel. Since her guns remained above water, the ship was used as an artillery battery to defend the city from advancing Allied forces. She served in this capacity until the end of the war in May. She was partially dismantled in situ after the end of the war, and finally raised in 1956 for scrapping.

Notes

Footnotes

Citations

References

Further reading
 
 
 

Königsberg-class cruisers (1927)
Ships built in Wilhelmshaven
1928 ships
World War II cruisers of Germany
World War II shipwrecks in the North Sea
Cruisers sunk by aircraft
Maritime incidents in March 1945
Military units and formations of Nazi Germany in the Spanish Civil War
Ships sunk by US aircraft